

Gitanjali is a collection of poems by the Bengali poet Rabindranath Tagore. Tagore received the Nobel Prize for Literature, for the English translation, Gitanjali:Song Offerings, making him the first non-European to receive this honor.

It is part of the UNESCO Collection of Representative Works. Its central theme is devotion, and its motto is "I am here to sing thee songs" (No. XV).

History
The original Bengali collection of 156/157 poems was published on August 14, 1910. The poems were based on medieval Indian lyrics of devotion with a common theme of love across most poems. Some poems also narrated a conflict between the desire for materialistic possessions and spiritual longing.

Reworking in other languages

The English version of Gitanjali or Song Offerings/Singing Angel is a collection of 103 English prose poems, which are Tagore's own English translations of his Bengali poems, and was first published in November 1912 by the India Society in London. It contained translations of 53 poems from the original Bengali Gitanjali, as well as 50 other poems from his other works. The translations were often radical, leaving out or altering large chunks of the poem and in one instance fusing two separate poems (song 95, which unifies songs 89 and 90 of Naivedya). The English Gitanjali became popular in the West, and was widely translated.

References

External links

 
Gitanjali website

Poetry collections by Rabindranath Tagore
1910 poetry books
Bengali-language poems
Bengali poetry collections